Progressio may refer to:

Progressio (organization), international development charity working for justice and the eradication of poverty
Populorum progressio, encyclical written by Pope Paul VI on the topic of "the development of peoples" and that the economy of the world should serve mankind and not just the few
Communio et Progressio, pastoral instruction on the means of social communication published in 1971, written after the Second Vatican Council
In Harmonia Progressio, motto of Institut Teknologi Bandung, a public university in Bandung, Indonesia